A service rifle (or standard-issue rifle) is a rifle a military issues to its personnel, typically to its regular infantry. In modern militaries, this is generally a versatile and rugged battle rifle, assault rifle, or carbine, suitable for use in nearly all environments and effective in most common combat situations. Most militaries also have service pistols or sidearms to accompany their service rifles. If the issued weapon is not a rifle, but instead a different type of firearm intended to serve in a specialized role—such as a submachine gun, shotgun, or machine gun—it is called a service weapon or service firearm.

History

Firearms with rifled barrels existed long before the 19th century but did not become widely used before the end of the American Civil War. Thus, rifles in the early 19th century were for specialist marksmen only, whilst ordinary infantry were issued less accurate smoothbore muskets which had a higher rate of fire, with bore diameters as high as 19 mm (0.75 inch).  Early "service rifles" of the 1840s, such as the Prussian Dreyse needle gun (1841) and the Swiss Infanteriegewehr Modell 1842, were technically still muskets.

Ordnance rifles were introduced in the 1860s, with the French Chassepot (1866) and the Swiss Peabody Gewehr Modell 1867. In the United States, the Springfield Model 1873 was the first breech-loading rifle adopted by the United States War Department for manufacture and widespread issue to U.S. troops.

The development of Poudre B smokeless powder in 1884, introduced with the French Lebel Model 1886 rifle, spelt the end of gunpowder warfare and led to a jump in small arms development. By the beginning of World War I, all of the world's major powers had adopted repeating bolt-action rifles such as the British Lee–Enfield, the German Gewehr 98, and the Russian Mosin–Nagant.

During the Second World War, the United States adopted the M1 Garand, first brought into service in 1936. Despite advancements in rifle technology, the United States was the only country to adopt a semi-automatic rifle as their service rifle. While other countries did develop semi-automatic rifles, these were used in limited numbers. For comparison, Germany produced 402,000 Gewehr 43 rifles, compared to 14,000,000 of the Karabiner 98k (a shortened variant of the Gewehr 98). However, it was during the war that Germany also produced the StG 44, an assault rifle, capable of controllable fully automatic fire from a 30-round magazine. After the war, the StG 44 was of particular interest to the Soviet Union, whose AK-47 was derived heavily from the German design. In the 1960s, the United States developed the M16 rifle, cementing the applicability of assault rifles.

See also
 List of rifles
 List of assault rifles
 Service firearm competitions

References

Personal weapons
Rifles
Rifles by country